The Minister of Public Administration (Italian: Ministro per la Pubblica Amministrazione) in Italy is one of the positions in the Italian government.

The current Minister for Public Administration is Paolo Zangrillo, of Forza Italia, who held the office since 22 October 2022 in the government of Giorgia Meloni.

List of Ministers
Parties:

Coalitions:

References

Public Administration